Trois-Rivières (literally 'Three Rivers') is a commune in the Somme department in Hauts-de-France in northern France. It was established on 1 January 2019 by merger of the former communes of Pierrepont-sur-Avre (the seat), Contoire and Hargicourt. Hargicourt—Pierrepont station has rail connections to Amiens and Compiègne.

See also
Communes of the Somme department

References

Communes of Somme (department)
Communes nouvelles of Somme
Populated places established in 2019
2019 establishments in France